Drinka Radovanović (born 1943) is a Serbian sculptor. She was a student of the famed Serbian sculptor Matija Vuković.

Works
Radovanović has created many statues of national heroes, including a monument to Karađorđe Petrović at Marićević Trench, which was erected in 2004 to commemorate the bicentennial of the First Serbian Uprising.

References

External links
 Marićevića jaruga at www.spomenicikulture.mi.sanu.ac.rs

1943 births
Serbian sculptors
Living people
Serbian women artists